Grinlandia is the fantasy world where most of the novels and short stories of Alexander Grin take place. The name of the country is never mentioned by the author himself, and the name Grinlandia was suggested in 1934 by literary critic Korneliy Zelinsky and adopted by Grin's fans since then.

The Alexander Grin museum in Theodosia contains the reconstructed map of the land.

It is a land by the ocean, apparently far from Europe (as some characters speak about "sailing to Europe") but populated by people with vaguely Western European names and appearance.

The language spoken in Grinlandia is also never identified (though the novels themselves are written in Russian). There are several cities (Liss, Zurbagan, San Riole, etc.) mentioned in several of the novels, but none of them are identified as a capital.

References

Fictional countries